Chen Xing (July 1921 – 15 May 2009) was a Chinese hydrologist who was involved in the design of the Banqiao Dam.

Chen was born in Nanjing and was a vocal critic of the government dam building policy, which involved many dams in the basin. He had recommended 12 sluice gates for the Banqiao Dam, but this was scaled back to 5 and Chen Xing was criticized as being too conservative. Other dams in the project, including the Shimantan Dam, had similar reductions of safety features and Chen was removed from the project. In 1961, after problems with the water system surfaced, he was brought back to help. Chen continued to be an outspoken critic of the system and was again removed from the project.

In August 1975, both Banqiao Dam and Shimantan Dam failed when deluged by Super Typhoon Nina, as Chen had warned. Their failure destroyed 60 more dams downstream.

In the 1980s, Chen participated in the Agri-Energy Roundtable (AER), attending and speaking at several conferences on the world stage and becoming the first Chinese to join AER's board. In 1984 Chen worked with his provincial governor, He Zhukang, to invite an international investment mission- later organized by AER - which proved successful in attracting world attention to the resources and opportunities in central China.

He died in May 2009 at the age of 87.

See also 

 Banqiao Dam
 1975 Banqiao Dam failure

References

1921 births
2009 deaths
Chinese hydrologists
Scientists from Nanjing